Wesley Chapel was a Methodist church in Cincinnati, Ohio, United States.  Built in 1831 on the north side of Fifth Street between Broadway and Sycamore, it was a simple red brick Georgian structure copied after John Wesley's original Methodist church in London.  With 1,200 seats, it was the largest meeting place west of the Alleghenies and the largest building in Cincinnati for many years. It was the seat of Methodism in Cincinnati.

The funeral of William Henry Harrison took place there in 1841.

In 1845, former president John Quincy Adams spoke at Wesley Chapel, dedicating the new Cincinnati Observatory being built on Mount Adams. In the years before the Civil War, political rallies and anti-slavery meetings frequently were held there.

During the early years, a cemetery was near the Chapel on Fifth Street; when the Wesleyan Cemetery, was founded in 1843 many of the bodies were moved to the new cemetery.

A long struggle took place between 1965 and 1972 between the Procter & Gamble Corporation and the people who wanted to save the oldest surviving church in the city, Wesley Chapel. P & G offered several options, including moving the building across the street.  The congregation elected to build a new church in the Over-the-Rhine neighborhood. Wesley Chapel was demolished in 1972.

The new Wesley Chapel is located at 80 East McMicken Avenue.

References

 Cincinnati, a Guide to the Queen City and Its Neighbors, American Guide Series, The Weisen-Hart Press, May 1943, pages 193 and 194.
 Cincinnati, the Queen City, by Daniel Hurley, published by the Cincinnati Historical Society, 2001, Cincinnati, Ohio Page 140

External links
 Wesley Chapel lost
 Wesley Records
 Guide to the Charles Reynolds Brown Papers
 Postcard Wesley Chapel
 Wesley Chapel, circa 1810

Churches in Cincinnati
Methodist churches in Ohio
History of Methodism in the United States
Churches completed in 1831
Buildings and structures demolished in 1972
Demolished churches in Ohio
Former churches in Ohio
Over-the-Rhine